The Lucchini P1-98 is a series of sports prototype race cars, designed, developed, and built by Italian manufacturer Lucchini Engineering, for sports car racing, conforming to the FIA's CN class, and produced in 1998.

References

Sports prototypes
Le Mans Prototypes